Río Nuevo is a district of the Pérez Zeledón canton, in the San José province of Costa Rica.

History 
Río Nuevo was created on 18 January 1984 by Acuerdo Ejecutivo 128.

Geography 
Río Nuevo has an area of  km² and an elevation of  metres.

Demographics 

For the 2011 census, Río Nuevo had a population of  inhabitants.

Transportation

Road transportation 
The district is covered by the following road routes:
 National Route 328

References 

Districts of San José Province
Populated places in San José Province